The Water Lily Nebula, in the southern constellation of Ara, is a pre-planetary nebula also known as IRAS 16594-4656, in the process of developing to a planetary nebula. It is one of the pre-planetary nebulae containing polycyclic aromatic hydrocarbons, organic hydrocarbons otherwise constituting the basis for life.

References

ESA press release
Sun Kwok's page on the object 
Simbad entry

Protoplanetary nebulae
Ara (constellation)